Ross Eugene Szabo (born Bethlehem, Pennsylvania) is the wellness director at Geffen Academy at UCLA. He is a mental health speaker and the CEO of Human Power Project.

Career
Szabo was the Director of Outreach for the National Mental Health Awareness Campaign from 2002-2010. In that time, Szabo helped create the first nationwide youth mental health speakers' bureau in the country, called the Heard, which was later acquired by Active Minds. He spoke to over one million young people and reached millions in media appearances. Szabo was awarded the 2010 Didi Hirsch Erasing the Stigma Leadership Award and had his work entered into the Congressional Record by Congressman Patrick Kennedy.

He is known for being one of the most sought after mental health speakers in the country, co-authoring Behind Happy Faces: Taking Charge of Your Mental Health - A Guide for Young Adults. and creating a mental health curriculum also titled Behind Happy Faces. The curriculum is being used by over 200,000 students across the country. Behind Happy Faces Mental Health Curriculum received the 2016 Excellence in Education Award from the Association of Fraternity/Sorority Advisors. Szabo's work at Geffen Academy at UCLA is to create a comprehensive mental health curriculum that follows the milestones of adolescent development for grades 6-12.

Szabo was diagnosed with bipolar disorder at age 16. As a senior at Northampton Senior High School in Northampton, PA, he was hospitalized for attempting to take his own life. He started talking about his experiences with bipolar disorder and the issues he faced during his senior year. After numerous struggles, Szabo graduated from American University in 2002. Szabo received an MA in Educational Psychology from Ball State University in 2018. He is a blogger for the Huffington Post and a returned Peace Corps Volunteer having served in Botswana from 2010-2012.

References

1978 births
Writers from Bethlehem, Pennsylvania
Living people
American health and wellness writers
Peace Corps volunteers
American male non-fiction writers
21st-century American male writers
21st-century American non-fiction writers
American University alumni
Ball State University alumni